Whakaotirangi was a Māori experimental gardener. Her name has been translated as "completion from the sky" or "the heavens complete".

In some accounts, Whakaotirangi was the daughter of Memeha-o-te-rangi, and the wife of Ruaeo, but she was kidnapped by Tama-te-kapua, the captain of the Arawa canoe, and brought to New Zealand circa 1350. Early accounts describe her as a leader, who may even have contributed to the building of the canoe. 

Whakaotirangi is described in both Tainui and Te Arawa traditions as the woman who carried seeds of important plants on the journey to New Zealand. According to Tainui tradition, Whakaotirangi landed at Kawhia in the Waikato, but moved around experimenting and testing plants for food and medicinal uses. In Te Arawa traditions, Whakaotirangi planted her kūmara garden of toroa-māhoe at both Whangaparaoa Bay (near Cape Runaway), and Maketu in the Bay of Plenty. The colder climate of New Zealand required new growing methods, particularly for kūmara, which develop a characteristic taste when exposed to frost. She may also have used hue (Lagenaria siceraria, calabash gourd), para (Marattia salicina, king fern), aute (paper mulberry, Broussonetia papyrifera) and karaka (New Zealand laurel). Moving to Aotea, she built a garden called Hawaiki Nui, where medicinal plants are still found.

Recognition 
Depictions of Whakaotirangi (for example, at the Ōtāwhao marae) show her with her basket of kūmara seed potatoes. She is embodied in both karakia and many whakataukī.

In 2017 Whakaotirangi was selected as one of the Royal Society Te Apārangi's "150 women in 150 words", celebrating the contribution of women to knowledge in New Zealand.

References

External links 
Picture of carving of Whakaotirangi at Ōtāwhao marae

Arawa (canoe)
Legendary Māori people

New Zealand Māori women
New Zealand gardeners
Agriculture in New Zealand